

County and City Hall, also known as Erie County Hall, is a historic city hall and courthouse building located at Buffalo in Erie County, New York.  It is a monumental granite structure designed by Rochester architect Andrew Jackson Warner and constructed between 1871 and 1875, with its cornerstone being laid on June 24, 1872.  The building has four floors and features a 270-foot high clock tower.

The County and City Hall building originally held offices for the City of Buffalo and Erie County.  City offices moved to the Buffalo City Hall as it was being constructed starting in 1929, and the building now houses Erie County court offices and records.

It was listed on the National Register of Historic Places, maintained by the National Park Service of the U.S. Department of the Interior in 1976. It is located within the Joseph Ellicott Historic District.

Gallery

See also
List of tallest buildings in Buffalo

References

External links
County and City Hall - U.S. National Register of Historic Places on Waymarking.com

Historic American Buildings Survey in New York (state)
Courthouses on the National Register of Historic Places in New York (state)
Government buildings completed in 1875
Erie County Courthouse
Clock towers in New York (state)
National Register of Historic Places in Buffalo, New York
City and town halls on the National Register of Historic Places in New York (state)
Skyscraper office buildings in Buffalo, New York